Aristodemus was a mythological figure who was a descendant of Heracles.

Aristodemus may also refer to:

Ancient Greece
 Aristodemus of Messenia (8th century BC), hero of the First Messenian War
 Aristodemus of Cumae (6th century BC), strategos and tyrant of Cumae
 Aristodemus of Sparta (5th century BC), Spartan warrior
 Aristodemus of Cydathenaeum (5th century BC), follower of Socrates depicted in Plato's Symposium
 Aristodemus of Miletus (4th century BC), diplomat
 Aristodemus the Good or Aristodemus of Megalopolis (3rd century BC), tyrant of Megalopolis who was assassinated around 252 BC

 Aristodemos of Nysa the Younger (1st century BC), Ancient Greek scholar and pedagogue, teacher of Strabo
 Aristodemus of Thebes, author, see List of anthologies of Greek epigrams

Other uses
 Papilio aristodemus, a species of butterfly